The Bank for Investment and Development of Cambodia is a bank in Cambodia. It is a subsidiary of the Bank for Investment and Development of Vietnam.

The bank has branches in all major cities of Cambodia, as well as in Ha Noi and Ho Chi Minh City.

The predecessor of the bank was called the Prosperity Investment Bank, which was founded in 2007. After restructuring, it was given the current name Bank for Investment and Development of Cambodia, or in short BIDC. BIDC is majority owned by the Bank for Investment and Development of Vietnam through its daughter Cambodian Investment & Development Co Ltd. In 2011, the bank was one of top 5 banks in Cambodia by assets.

The mission of the bank of to provide capital for investment in Cambodia, in particular investments by Vietnamese entities, and investments through BIDC form a significant part of Vietnamese investments in Cambodia.

See also 

 List of banks in Cambodia

References 

Banks of Vietnam
Banks of Cambodia
Banks established in 2009
Government-owned companies of Vietnam
Cambodian brands
Cambodian companies established in 2009